The 'Umu is the fourth studio album by Australian hip hop act Koolism, released in September 2010 by Invada Records. The ‘umu is an underground oven used in Polynesian cooking and a nod to MC Hau’s Tongan heritage. Self-deprecation aside, Hau says that the album is "dedicated to the essence of original and classic hip hop, and the title is inspired by an underground oven. Dan and I, along with some close friends, have been cooking up this album since December 2006. And now, in 2010, we’re finally ready to serve it."

Track listing

 Welcome To The 'Umu
 Hanz High
 Ready
 Cash Monet
 Jam Hot
 Have, Have Not
 Musical In Between Bit
 Movin'
 Can't Stand It
 Hommage A La Wu
 Yeah
 Lovely
 Bass Jammin' Interlude
 Turning Back
 Get Free
 Alone

References

External links
 fasterlouder.com.au The 'Umu Review
 rhum.org.au The 'Umu Review
 thebrag.com - The 'Umu Review

2010 albums
Koolism albums